The 1951 Gator Bowl was an American college football bowl game played on January 1, 1951, at Gator Bowl Stadium in Jacksonville, Florida.  It was the sixth annual playing of the Gator Bowl.  The game pitted the Wyoming Cowboys, champions of the Skyline Conference (also known as the Mountain States Conference), against the Washington and Lee Generals, champions of the Southern Conference.

Background
The Cowboys were champions of the Mountain States Conference and had finished the regular season undefeated. The Generals won the Southern Conference with a perfect conference record, led by quarterback Gil Bocetti and fullback Walt Michaels, though Michaels would be out due to an appendicitis. They had wins over West Virginia, Virginia Tech, Louisville, and Richmond while losing to Virginia and Tennessee. They were the first team from Virginia to play in a bowl game.

Game summary
After a scoreless first quarter, the Cowboys started a crucial second quarter with an Eddie Talboom touchdown pass to Dick Campbell. A crucial point in the game came on the following drive by the Generals. Bocetti was driving his team down the field when his pass was intercepted by Selmer Pederson. Talboom drove his team down the field, culminated by a touchdown run by Talboom himself, as it was 13–0 at halftime. Despite outgaining them in yards, the Generals could not capitalize on scoring until it was too late. Meanwhile, in the third quarter, fullback John Melton added in his own touchdown run, making it 20–0. With the game already decided, the Generals added a meaningless touchdown run by Gil Bocetti as the Cowboys won their first ever bowl game. Talboom went 10 for 14 for 141 yards and also rushed for 31 yards.

Aftermath
This would start Wyoming's streak of bowl game wins, winning three more before their first loss in 1968. They have not played in the Gator Bowl since this game. The Generals have never played in a bowl game since this game, as they now play in Division III.

Statistics

References

Gator Bowl
Gator Bowl
Wyoming Cowboys football bowl games
Washington and Lee Generals football bowl games
Gator Bowl
January 1951 sports events in the United States